Clubul Sportiv Muncitoresc Reșița, commonly known as CSM Reșița or simply as Reșița, is a professional football club based in Reșița, Romania, currently playing in the Liga III.

The club was founded on 25 May 1926 as UD (Uzinele și Domeniile) Reșița and throughout its almost centennial history survived to many sharp ups and downs, from a national title in 1931 and a silver medal in 1932 to the last shine in the late 1990s, several reorganizations in the 2000s and an almost fatal fall at the level of amateur leagues during the 2010s.

Over time CSM had important battles with local rivals as Muncitorul Reșița or Gloria Reșița, but has secured itself the city's supremacy, as well as the title of county's most important and supported club. Despite the strong support from the Mountain Banat, Reșițenii have never succeeded in imposing themselves on a regional level, not even the national title won in 1931 or the 1954 cup not being able to tilt the balance in favor of "the red and blacks", in their duel for Banat against FC Politehnica Timișoara. In time the rivalry between the two sides increased as intensity and continued even after the bankruptcy of FC Politehnica, but now at a much lower level, against ASU Politehnica Timișoara, fans team and unofficial successor of the old white and violet side.

CSM Reșița is nicknamed by fans Rosso-Nerii or Milan from Banat due to its classical red kits with black stripes. Reșița's supporters are well known in Romania for the eagerness with which support their team, the ultras group of CSM being named Guardia Ultra(GU). Rosso-Nerii play their home matches on Mircea Chivu Stadium.

History

The club was founded on 25 May 1926 from a merger between two local teams. The new team was named UDR (Uzinele și Domeniile Reșița or "Reșița Factories and Domains"). In the 1930–31 season, UDR won the Romanian West League and qualified to the national finals, where it defeated Prahova Ploiești and Societatea Gimnastică Sibiu. In the following season, the club finished runners-up to FC Venus București .

After World War II and the advent of the Communist regime, professional football was forbidden. UDR merged with a local labor union team and was renamed Oțelul (Steel) Reșița. After several further name changes, it was ultimately branded Metalul (Metal) Reșița.

The 1950s were a period of slow decline for the club. By 1954, Metalul Reșița was playing in the Romanian second division, Divizia B, finishing the season in 7th place. However, the season brought also brought the club's second trophy, in the form of the 1954 Cupa României. The Reșița, made up of steel factory workers, mechanics, electricians and railway workers, upset several leading clubs in the cup, including five from Divizia A. These were, in turn, Știința Timișoara (6th place in Divizia A in the 1954 season) 5–1, Locomotiva Tg. Mureș (10th place) 4–0, Locomotiva Timișoara (4th place) 2–0, and CCA București (2nd place) 1–0. In the December 5, 1954 final, Metalul Reșița met Dinamo București (3rd place in Divizia A) in Bucharest. Reșița won the game 2–0, with Ştefan Szeleş scoring twice in the 30th and 40th minutes. It was the first time that a team from Divizia B had won the trophy.

During its 87-year history, the club won one championship and one cup and has played for 16 seasons in Liga I, the last time in the 1999–2000 season.

The early 2000s brought financial problems to Domanului Valley and, in 2004, Reșița was dissolved and converted to FC Universitatea Craiova's reserve team. In 2005, the club was refounded as FCM Reșița and bought its place in the second tier from Tricotaje Ineu, but lost its brand, record and the right to use the name of CSM Reșița.

The club was dissolved in the autumn of 2008 due to financial difficulties. In the summer of 2009, it was brought back to life, this time with the name of Școlar Reșița, playing in Liga III, Romania's third league. In the summer of 2012, it was renamed again, this time returning to the old name of FCM Reșița.

In the 2012–13 season, the club finished third in Liga III. The objective for the 2013–14 season was initially to be promoted to Liga II after a six-year absence, but in the summer of 2013 Damila Măciuca was moved to Reșița and was renamed to Metalul Reșița. The municipal government of Reșița chose to support this new team, forcing Școlar Reșița to enter Liga IV due to the loss of funding.

In 2015, relations between Metalul and the Municipality of Reșița cooled and the latter resumed its financial support for CSM Școlar. Metalul moved to Snagov in 2016 and was renamed a year later to Sportul Snagov. On the other hand, CSM Școlar was promoted back to Liga III at the end of the 2015–16 season. It then finished runner-up in 2017 and 2018 before winning the fourth series and being promoted to Liga II in 2019.

CSM Școlar returned to the second division after an 11-year absence, regaining its logo and name. It was thus renamed to CSM Reșița in the summer of 2019.

Ground

CSM Reșița plays its home matches at Mircea Chivu Stadium, a sports complex named after manager Mircea Chivu, who was also the father of player Cristian Chivu. With a capacity of 12,500 seats, the stadium is located in Domanului Valley. It was opened in the 1920s and was renovated several times, most recently in 2018.

Honours

Domestic
CSM Reșița is the most successful team from Caraș-Severin County.

Leagues

Liga I
Winners (1): 1930–31
Runners-up (1): 1931–32
Liga II
Winners (4): 1937–38, 1971–72, 1991–92, 1996–97
Runners-up (5): 1948–49, 1961–62, 1962–63, 1963–64, 1968–69
Liga III
Winners (3): 1936–37, 2018–19, 2021–22
Runners-up (2): 2016–17, 2017–18
Liga IV – Caraș-Severin
Winners (1): 2015–16
Runners-up (1): 2014–15

Cups

Cupa României
Winners (1): 1954
Cupa României – Caraș-Severin
Winners (1): 2014–15

Players

First-team squad

Out on loan

Club officials

Board of directors

Current technical staff

Chronology of names

League history

Notable former players
The footballers enlisted below have had international cap(s) for their respective countries at junior and/or senior level and/or more than 100 caps for CSM Reșița.

  Ion Atodiresei
  Aurel Beldeanu
  Dean Beța
  Cristian Chivu
  Vasile Ciocoi
  Iosif Czako
  Ovidiu Dănănae
  Vasile Deheleanu
  Adalbert Deșu
  Ciprian Dianu
  Leontin Doană
  Mihai Gabel
  Dudu Georgescu
  Ion Goanță
  Gheorghe Gornea
  Ion Ibric
  Ștefan Iovan
  Stanislau Konrad
  Eugen Lakatos
  Cicerone Manolache
  Lucian Marinescu
  Dorinel Munteanu
  Dorel Mutică
  Cătălin Necula
  George Ogăraru
  Daniel Oprița
  Silviu Ploeșteanu
  Dan Potocianu
  Cristian Pușcaș
  Roco Sandu
  Cristian Scutaru
  Gavril Serfözö
   Francisc Spielmann
  Ion Timofte
  Florea Voinea
  Dorin Zotincă

Notable managers

 Mircea Chivu
 Leontin Doană
 Ioan Reinhardt
 Victor Roșca
 Roco Sandu
 Gabriel Stan
 Flavius Stoican
 Costică Ștefănescu
 Aurel Șunda

References

External links

 
Football clubs in Caraș-Severin County
Sport in Reșița
Association football clubs established in 1926
Liga I clubs
Liga II clubs
Liga III clubs
Liga IV clubs
1926 establishments in Romania